Hyloscirtus tapichalaca is a species of frog in the family Hylidae. It is endemic to Ecuador and only known from the vicinity of its type locality in the Tapichalaca Biological Reserve, Zamora-Chinchipe Province. It is named after the type locality, which is a reserve owned by the Fundación de Conservación Jocotoco. Hyloscirtus tapichalaca belongs to the Hyloscirtus larinopygion group, although its placement with the group is uncertain; it may be the sister taxon of all other species in the group.

Description
Adult males measure  and adult females  in snout–vent length. The body and the limbs are robust. The snout is nearly truncate in lateral view. The tympanum is distinct, and the supratympanic fold is thick, obscuring its posterodorsal edge. The fingers and the toes are broad, bear large discs, and have webbing. The dorsum is gray to pale brown, and the flanks are gray to gray brown. The digital discs, lateral and lower margins of vent, knees, elbows, and outer margin of forearms are white. The iris is yellow-gold. Males have a single subgular vocal sac.

Reproduction
The male advertisement call consists of a single, unpulsed note of variable duration (0.14–0.19 seconds). The calls are emitted at irregular time intervals (0.7–1.2 seconds apart), most of them clustered in bouts. Scars in the males suggest male-male combats. The tadpoles probably develop in streams.

Behavior
Hyloscirtus tapichalaca exude a sticky, white fluid when captured. One specimen assumed a posture where the white markings in the posterior surfaces of the elbows, heels, and vent were exposed. This is likely an anti-predator behavior.

Habitat and conservation
The type locality is a small cascading stream in montane cloud forest. Males have been observed calling from branches by stream margins.

Threats to this species are unknown. The type locality is a protected area. Habitat degradation likely occurs outside the reserve.

References

Hyloscirtus
Endemic fauna of Ecuador
Amphibians of Ecuador
Amphibians of the Andes
Amphibians described in 2003
Taxonomy articles created by Polbot
Taxa named by Luis Aurelio Coloma